Kelvin Ransey (born May 3, 1958) is a retired American collegiate and professional basketball player of the 1970s and 1980s, respectively.

Ransey attended Toledo's Macomber High School in the mid-1970s.  He was a four-year starter at Ohio State University from 1976 to 1979 where he played both point and shooting guard.

The 6'1" (1.85 m) Ransey was the fourth overall pick in the 1980 NBA draft, by the Chicago Bulls.  He was traded to the Portland Trail Blazers before the season began. He was runner-up by one vote for NBA Rookie of the Year (to Darrell Griffith) in 1980–81. Ransey played for six years in the NBA for 3 teams, averaging 11.4 points and 5.2 assists per game.  His best season, statistically, was his second, when he averaged over 16 points and 7 assists.

Ransey retired following the 1985–86 season, returning to Toledo to become a preacher.  He attempted a comeback in the 1989–90 season, playing 25 games for the Columbus Horizon of the Continental Basketball Association.  He averaged 13.9 points per game for the Horizon.  In 2000, he moved to Tupelo, Mississippi. Twice married, he has six children.

Ransey's younger brother, Clinton Ransey, played college basketball at Cleveland State from 1983 to 1987.  Clinton was a teammate of Ken "The Mouse" McFadden for part of his college career.

Notes

External links
Kelvin Ransey NBA statistics, basketballreference.com

1958 births
Living people
African-American basketball players
All-American college men's basketball players
American men's basketball players
Basketball players from Ohio
Chicago Bulls draft picks
Columbus Horizon players
Dallas Mavericks players
New Jersey Nets players
Ohio State Buckeyes men's basketball players
Point guards
Portland Trail Blazers players
Shooting guards
Sportspeople from Toledo, Ohio
Sportspeople from Tupelo, Mississippi
21st-century African-American people
20th-century African-American sportspeople